Chris Marshall, whose real name is Adrian Marshall, otherwise known as Chris Marsh, and Izes, is a Jamaican reggae and dancehall singer, producer songwriter and singjay. He is best known for co-writing "Temperature", by Sean Paul which became a Billboard Hot 100 number-one song in 2006 and appearing on Anitta album Kisses (album) on the single - Tu Y Yo .

Life and career 
Marshall was born in Linstead, Jamaica. He started producing and performing on local concerts at the age of twelve. He attended St. Mary High and McGrath High in St. Catherine.

Discography

As songwriter 
 "Leyenda" by Justin Quiles from the album Realidadd , 2019
 "Temperature" by Sean Paul from the album The Trinity, 2005
 "Heart Attack" by Beenie Man from the album Undisputed, 2006
 "Tu Y Yo" by Anitta with Chris Marshall, from the album Kisses, 2019
"Prendía" by Dalex, from the album  Climax, 2019

As featured artist 
 "Tu Y Yo" by Anitta with Chris Marshall, from the album Kisses, 2019
 "Na Na Na" by Dalex ft. Alex Rose, Gigolo y La Exce, Chris Marshall, From the album la Neuva Ola  2018 
"Fiya Blaza" by Dvbbs X GTA ft Chris Marshall From the album Blood Of My Blood 2017

As record producer 
Gal Farm (2015) by Popcaan

References 

Reggae fusion artists
Jamaican male singers
Jamaican reggae singers
Jamaican DJs
Jamaican dancehall musicians
People from Saint Catherine Parish
1982 births
Living people